Lea Pericoli (born 22 March 1935) is an Italian former tennis player and later television presenter and journalist from Milan. She reached the last sixteen of the French Open two times and the Wimbledon Championships three times, and is also famous for her choice of clothing.

Family background
Pericoli married Tito Fontana in 1964.

Tennis

Grand Slam
Pericoli reached the last sixteen of the French Championships singles in 1960 and 1964. She reached the fourth round of Wimbledon three times in 1965, 1967, and 1970.

Titles
Partnered by Helga Schultze, Pericoli won the doubles title at the 1974 WTA Swiss Open, defeating Kayoko Fukuoka and Michelle Rodríguez in the final in straight sets.

Fed Cup
Pericoli made her Fed Cup debut for Italy in its inaugural year, 1963, and represented Italy in nine years of the competition, winning 8 of her 16 singles matches and 7 of her 14 doubles matches. Her last Fed Cup match was in 1975.

Italian international championships
She partnered with Silvana Lazzarino to reach five women's doubles finals in six years (1962–65, 1967) at the Italian International Championships, with four of those coming in consecutive years.

Clothing
In 1955, Pericoli played at the Wimbledon Championships wearing clothes designed by Ted Tinling. Her clothing generated so much interest in later years, that it was kept secret until her appearances on the court. In particular, her fur-lined clothing worn at the 1964 Wimbledon Championships caught the attention of observers.

In 2001, the Sunday Mirror quoted Pericoli as saying "I became famous because of my clothes, not my playing." and "I didn't make any money from tennis, but if I'd been born 30 years later I would have become terribly rich like Anna Kournikova".

Awards
On 7 May 2015, in the presence of the President of Italian National Olympic Committee (CONI), Giovanni Malagò, was inaugurated in the Olympic Park of the Foro Italico in Rome, along Viale delle Olimpiadi, the Walk of Fame of Italian sport, consisting of 100 tiles that chronologically report names of the most representative athletes in the history of Italian sport. On each tile are the name of the sportsman, the sport in which he distinguished himself and the symbol of CONI. One of these tiles is dedicated to Lea Pericoli.

Pericoli was awarded the Fed Cup Award of Excellence in 2007.

Other activities
Pericoli had a contract with Superga for modelling shoes.

Pericoli was popular on Italian television in the 1970s, presenting the programs Paroliamo and Caccia al Tesoro in addition to commentating tennis.

Pericoli was introduced to journalism by Indro Montanelli. She worked as a tennis and fashion journalist. She was a journalist for Il Giornale.

Pericoli wrote the autobiographical book Maldafrica, published in Italian in 2009.

Grand Slam singles performance timeline

See also
 Walk of Fame of Italian sport

References

External links
 

1935 births
Living people
Italian female tennis players
Tennis players from Milan
Italian journalists
Italian women journalists
Italian television presenters
Italian autobiographers
Women autobiographers
Italian women television presenters